This is the list of those writers who wrote short stories in Urdu Language.

References 

Urdu-language short story writers
 
Urdu